Dinei is a given name. Dinei may refer to:

 Dinei (footballer, born 1970), Claudinei Alexandre Pires, Brazilian football striker
 Dinei (footballer, born 1971), Valdinei Rocha de Oliveira, Brazilian football forward
 Dinei (footballer, born 1979), Vatinei César Moreira dos Santos, Brazilian football midfielder
 Dinei (footballer, born 1981), Ednet Luís De Oliveira, Brazilian football striker
 Dinei (footballer, born 1983), Telmário de Araújo Sacramento, Brazilian football striker
 Dinei Florencio (fl. 2016), American electrical engineer

See also
 Diney (disambiguation)